Humphry Morice may refer to:

 Humphry Morice (Governor of the Bank of England) (c. 1671 – 1731), British merchant
 Humphry Morice (MP for Launceston) (1723–1785), British politician